SFK 2000 Sarajevo (BIH) is a women's professional football club from the city of Sarajevo that is situated in Bosnia and Herzegovina. The club competes in the highest level of women's football in Bosnia and Herzegovina, the Bosnia and Herzegovina Women's Premier League. The club was established in June 2000; the name was chosen from a lower-tier men's football club which is now defunct.

Following its foundation, the club quickly won the national championship, and has subsequently dominated women's football in the country, winning 18 consecutive titles so far. The club has participated in the UEFA Women's Cup from 2003 onwards and has reached the final rounds three times. In the 2009–10 UEFA Women's Champions League, when the competition was rebranded and reorganized, the side started in the round of 32 but lost to Russia's Zvezda 2005 Perm 8–0 on aggregate. In the next two years the team had to go through the qualifying phase, failing both times, but in the 2012–13 UEFA Women's Champions League they managed to qualify after hosting the qualifying phase in Sarajevo and defeating two clubs which played the round of 32 of the previous season of the Women's champions league.

The club advanced to the round of 32 once again, this time in the 2018–19 UEFA Women's Champions League season, but got eliminated by Chelsea F.C. 11–0 on aggregate.

On 4 July 2015, SFK 2000 signed an agreement on long-term cooperation with Bosnian men's football club FK Sarajevo, by which SFK 2000 assumed the latter's maroon and white colors, club logo and kit. FK Sarajevo board members entered the SFK 2000 board, by which the two clubs became de facto function as one.

Honours

Domestic competitions
 Bosnian women's football championship (20): 2002–03 to 2021–22 (Record)
 Bosnian Women's Cup (17) : (2001–02 or 2002–03), 2003–04, 2005–06 to 2018–19, 2020–21, 2021–22 (Record)
 Bosnian Women's Supercup (3): 1998, 2000, 2001 (Record)

Players

Current squad

Club officials

Club management

UEFA competitions record

References

External links

2000 establishments in Bosnia and Herzegovina
Association football clubs established in 2000
Football clubs in Bosnia and Herzegovina
Bosnia and Herzegovina women's football clubs